The Men competition at the 2020 World Allround Speed Skating Championships was held on 29 February and 1 March 2020.

Results

500 m
The race was started on 28 February at 12:25.

5000 m
The race was started on 29 February at 16:08.

1500 m
The race was started on 1 March at 13:52.

10000 m
The race was started on 1 March at 15:33.

Overall standings
After all events.

References

Men